Alexander or Alex Henderson may refer to:

 Alexander Henderson (theologian) (c. 1583–1646), Scottish theologian
 Alexander Henderson (priest) (1807–1888), Scottish Episcopalian priest, Dean of Glasgow and Galloway
 Alexander Henderson (Canadian politician) (1860–1940), historical member of the Legislative Assembly of British Columbia, and Commissioner of Yukon 1907–1911
 Alexander Henderson (American politician) (1738–1815), Scottish merchant and politician in Virginia
 Alexander D. Henderson (businessman) (1865–1925), vice-president of the California Perfume Company
 Alexander D. Henderson Jr. (1895–1964), son of the perfume businessman
 Alexander Henderson, 1st Baron Faringdon (1850–1934), British politician
 Alexander Henderson (physician) (1780–1863), Scottish physician, author of History of Ancient and Modern Wines (1824)
 Alexander Gavin Henderson, 2nd Baron Faringdon (1902–1977), British Labour politician
 Alexander Lamont Henderson (1838–1907), British photographer
 Alexander Henderson of Press (c. 1770–1826), Lord Provost of Edinburgh, 1823–1825
Alex Henderson, band member of Big Bad Voodoo Daddy
Alex Henderson (Scottish footballer), Scottish footballer
Alex Henderson (footballer, born 2001), English footballer